Grace Adams (born 2 November 1995) is a Ghanaian footballer who plays midfielder for Kazakhstan championship club BIIK Shymkent and the Ghana women's national team.

Club Career 
Adams began her career in Ghana at Prison Ladies, before moving to the United States to continue her education and career as a student-athlete. She enrolled in the University of South Florida from 2015 to 2018, playing for their club South Florida Bulls in the American Athletic Conference. She won the 2017 season.

On 16 August 2019, she joined Nigeria Women Premier League side Rivers Angels on a one-year deal. On 24 January 2020 Adams moved to Lebanon, signing for SAS mid-2019–20 season. She played seven matches for her new club, assisting five goals; she helped her side win the league.

Adams returned to Ghana, playing for Berry Ladies in the National Women's League. In 2021, she joined Kazakhstan championship club BIIK Shymkent.

International Career 
Grace Adams first international appearance for Ghana was in 2010 at the second edition of the FIFA U-17 Women's World Cup held in Trinidad and Tobago. Adams then progressed to the under-20 team, who qualified to the 2012 FIFA U-20 Women's World Cup. In Adams's second appearance at the U-20 level, she captained them at the 2014 FIFA U-20 Women's World Cup.

On 30 November 2020, Adams represented the senior team in a friendly against Morocco, coming on in the 80th minute in a 2–0 win.

Honors 

South Florida Bulls
 American Athletic Conference: 2017

SAS
 Lebanese Women's Football League: 2019–20

BIIK Shymkent
 Kazakhstan championship: 2021, 2022

See also
 List of Ghana women's international footballers

References

External links
 

1995 births
Living people
Footballers from Accra
Ghanaian women's footballers
Women's association football defenders
Women's association football midfielders
South Florida Bulls women's soccer players
Stars Association for Sports players
Lebanese Women's Football League players
Ghana women's international footballers
Ghanaian expatriate women's footballers
Ghanaian expatriate sportspeople in the United States
Expatriate women's soccer players in the United States
Ghanaian expatriate sportspeople in Nigeria
Expatriate footballers in Nigeria Women Premier League
Ghanaian expatriate sportspeople in Lebanon
Expatriate women's footballers in Lebanon
Ghanaian expatriate sportspeople in Kazakhstan
Expatriate women's footballers in Kazakhstan
Berry Ladies F.C. players